Andrew Arthur Carey (born Andrew Arthur Hexem, October 18, 1931 – December 15, 2011) was an American professional baseball third baseman. He played in Major League Baseball for the New York Yankees (1952–1960), Kansas City Athletics (1960–1961), Chicago White Sox (1961), and Los Angeles Dodgers (1962).

Early life
Carey was born on October 18, 1931, as Andrew Arthur Hexem in Oakland, California, and raised in Alameda, California. His parents divorced when he was young, and his mother remarried Kenneth Carey, a divorce lawyer. Carey later took his adopted father's name.

Carey attended Alameda High School, where he played as a pitcher and third baseman for the school's baseball team. He graduated in 1949, and rather than sign a professional baseball contract, attended Saint Mary's College of California. Carey made Saint Mary's college baseball team as a freshman. He also played semi-professional baseball in Weiser, Idaho, where he caught the attention of New York Yankees scout Joe Devine.

Career
Carey signed with the Yankees, receiving a $60,000 signing bonus. He made his major league debut with the Yankees in 1952. By 1954, Carey was the Yankees' starting third baseman. That year, he had a .302 batting average and 65 runs batted in (RBIs) in 122 games played. In 1955, Carey led the American League with 11 triples. While playing for the Yankees in the 1956 World Series, Carey twice helped preserve Don Larsen's perfect game against the Dodgers on October 8, 1956. In the second inning, the Dodgers’ Jackie Robinson smacked a shot between third and short that Carey knocked down, allowing shortstop Gil McDougald to pick up the ball and nip Robinson at first. In the eighth, he robbed Gil Hodges by snaring a low line drive that seemed headed for left field.

Carey played for the Yankees into the 1960 season. By this point, the emergence of Clete Boyer as the Yankees third baseman led them to trade Carey after four games to the Kansas City Athletics for Bob Cerv.

In June 1961, the Athletics traded Carey, Larsen, Ray Herbert, and Al Pilarcik to the Chicago White Sox for Wes Covington, Stan Johnson, Bob Shaw, and Gerry Staley. After the 1961 season, the White Sox traded Carey with Frank Barnes to the Philadelphia Phillies for Taylor Phillips and Bob Sadowski. However, Carey refused to report to Philadelphia, and the White Sox sent Cal McLish to the Phillies to compensate them. The White Sox then traded Carey to the Los Angeles Dodgers for Ramon Conde and Jim Koranda before the 1962 season. The Dodgers released Carey after the 1962 season.

In an 11-year career, he had a .260 batting average, with 64 home runs, and 350 RBIs. He had 741 career hits. He finished his career with 38 triples.

Personal life
After he retired, Carey worked as a stockbroker for Mitchum, Jones, and Templeton in Los Angeles.

Carey married four times, and was divorced three times. He had four children. Carey marriages included being married to actress, Lucy Marlow.

Carey died on December 15, 2011, in Costa Mesa, California, of Lewy body dementia.

See also
List of Major League Baseball annual triples leaders

References

External links

Andy Carey Oral History Interview (1 of 2) - National Baseball Hall of Fame Digital Collection
Andy Carey Oral History Interview (2 of 2) - National Baseball Hall of Fame Digital Collection

1931 births
2011 deaths
Baseball players from Oakland, California
Chicago White Sox players
Deaths from dementia in California
Deaths from Lewy body dementia
Kansas City Athletics players
Kansas City Blues (baseball) players
Los Angeles Dodgers players
Major League Baseball third basemen
New York Yankees players
People from Alameda, California
Saint Mary's Gaels baseball players
Syracuse Chiefs players